Jurellana tithonia, the only species in the genus Jurellana, is a fossil crab. It was found in limestone rocks from the Ernstbrunn Formation in Austria, which have been dated to the Tithonian (late Jurassic). It was originally thought to be the world's oldest porcelain crab, but was later determined to actually be a true crab.

Taxonomy and stratigraphy
Jurellana tithonia was described in 2010 by  palaeontologists Carrie Schweitzer and Rodney Feldmann, as the only species in the genus. The genus' name was based on the name of the type genus of the porcelain crabs, Porcellana, and the word Jurassic. The specific epithet  also refers to the age during which the animal lived – in this case, the Tithonian. The type specimens were discovered near Ernstbrunn, Lower Austria, and are now held at the Naturhistorisches Museum in Vienna. The rocks that contained the specimens have been dated to the Tithonian based on the ammonites they contain; they also contain a number of crabs. This makes Jurellana the oldest known porcelain crab. However, a 2019 study found it to be a true crab instead, belonging to the new family Jurellanidae along with the newly described genus Ovalopus.

Description
Two specimens of Jurellana tithonia are known, one considerably larger than the other. J. tithonia differs from other porcelain crabs in that its rostrum, rather than extending forwards from the front of the carapace, is turned 90° downwards. The appendages of the animal have not been preserved in either specimen.

References

Porcelain crabs
Jurassic crustaceans
Monotypic arthropod genera
Fossil taxa described in 2010
Prehistoric animals of Europe